"It's a New Day" is a funk song written and performed by James Brown. Released as a single in 1970, it charted #3 R&B and #32 Pop.

Live performances of the song appear on the albums Revolution of the Mind (1971) and Love Power Peace (1992; recorded 1971).

References

James Brown songs
Songs written by James Brown
1970 singles